From Me to You is the second album by American rapper Crunchy Black. Released on June 12, 2007 without his permission, the album contains 16 tracks .

Track listing

References

External links
[ Billboard.com]

2007 albums
Crunchy Black albums